Giancarlo Neri is a sculptor born in Naples in 1955. Perhaps his best-known work is The Writer, a 9-metre-high table and chair made from steel plated with wood, a piece about writer's block. It has been exhibited in Rome and on Hampstead Heath in London in 2005.

At one time he played professional soccer for the New York Apollo of the American Soccer League.

References

20th-century Italian sculptors
20th-century Italian male artists
Italian male sculptors
21st-century Italian sculptors
Italian footballers
Artists from Naples
American Soccer League (1933–1983) players
New York Apollo players
Living people
Association footballers not categorized by position
Year of birth missing (living people)
21st-century Italian male artists